Francesco Cerretelli (born 21 January 2000) is an Italian professional footballer who plays as a midfielder for  club Carrarese, on loan from Cremonese.

Club career
He made his Serie C debut for Pistoiese on 18 February 2018 in a game against Olbia.

On 11 January 2019, he joined Gavorrano on loan.

In July 2021, he joined to Cremonese, and was loaned to Serie C club Pro Sesto. On 12 July 2022, Cerretelli was loaned to Carrarese.

References

External links
 

2000 births
Living people
Footballers from Florence
Italian footballers
Association football midfielders
Serie C players
Serie D players
Bologna F.C. 1909 players
Scandicci Calcio players
U.S. Pistoiese 1921 players
U.S. Gavorrano players
U.S. Cremonese players
Pro Sesto 2013 players
Carrarese Calcio players